Andrés Ávila Navarro (born June 20, 1990) is a Mexican professional baseball pitcher for the Leones de Yucatán of the Mexican Baseball League.

Career

Oakland Athletics
Avila signed as a non-drafted free agent with the Oakland Athletics on April 5, 2010. He played with their rookie Arizona League Athletics in 2010 and 2011. In 2012, he advanced to the Class A Short Season Vermont Lake Monsters. He pitched for both the Class A Beloit Snappers and Class A Advanced Stockton Ports in 2013 and 2014. In 2015, he pitched for Stockton and the Double-A Midland RockHounds. During the 2016 season, he pitched for Midland, but he also made three postseason appearances for the Triple-A Nashville Sounds. He elected free agency after the season.

Atlanta Braves
On November 11, 2016, Avila signed as a minor league contract with the Atlanta Braves. He was released by the Braves on April 3, 2017.

Leones de Yucatán
On June 24, 2017, Avila signed with the Tigres de Quintana Roo of the Mexican Baseball League. He was traded to the Leones de Yucatán on June 25, 2017. Avila did not play in a game in 2020 due to the cancellation of the Mexican League season because of the COVID-19 pandemic.

International career
Avila was selected for the Mexico national baseball team at the 2017 World Baseball Classic and 2019 exhibition games against Japan.

References

External links

1990 births
Living people
Arizona League Athletics players
Baseball players from Sonora
Beloit Snappers players
Cañeros de Los Mochis players
Leones de Yucatán players
Mexican expatriate baseball players in the United States
Mexican League baseball pitchers
Midland RockHounds players
Nashville Sounds players
People from Guaymas
Stockton Ports players
Tigres de Quintana Roo players
Vermont Lake Monsters players
2017 World Baseball Classic players